Best of the Best 3: No Turning Back is a 1995 martial arts action film directed by the film's star Phillip Rhee. It is the second sequel in the Best of the Best film series. The film co-stars Christopher McDonald, Gina Gershon, Dee Wallace and an uncredited R. Lee Ermey and an uncredited Michele Bartlett. Rhee's Tommy Lee returns to his small hometown to find it under siege by a neo-Nazi gang whose leader is played by Mark Rolston.

Plot
In the small town of "Liberty", a vicious group of neo-Nazis have been terrorizing the populace, most recently having murdered an African-American pastor and set fire to his church. While visiting his sister and brother-in-law in Liberty, Tommy Lee (Phillip Rhee) crosses paths with the group's leader Donnie Hansen (Mark Rolston), and is drawn into the conflict when his sister is attacked in their car. Later, the group attempts to harass a schoolteacher named Margo Preston (Gina Gershon) at the local 4-H fair, but Tommy intervenes and fends them off. Ungrateful at first, she eventually warms up to Tommy when they are set up on a blind date, and they start a relationship.

Meanwhile, the town of Liberty is holding hearings on whether to sell a parcel of land on the outskirts of town to the neo-Nazis, who have set up their headquarters on the land. Margo and Tommy join with the town's residents and convince the town council to reject the land sale, which means the neo-Nazis will soon have to vacate the premises.

After this defeat, the neo-Nazis arm themselves and launch an assault on Tommy's family. After saving Margo from an attempted rape, Tommy returns home to find his sister badly beaten. He and his brother-in-law, the local sheriff Jack Banning (Christopher McDonald), decide to take matters into their own hands and invade the group's heavily guarded base, where Jack's children have been taken hostage. After a long, climactic fight, the children are rescued and Tommy defeats Hansen in single combat, but refuses to kill him, knowing that it would only further his message of hatred.  As Tommy turns away, Hansen takes aim at him with a rifle, prompting a local teenager named Owen Tucker (Peter Simmons) to shoot and kill Hansen himself, thus brokering a new peace in the town. The ending scene shows the murdered pastor's child reading from the Bible and the church being rebuilt.

Cast
 Phillip Rhee as Tommy Lee
 Christopher McDonald as Sheriff Jack Banning
 Gina Gershon as Margo Preston
 Mark Rolston as Donnie Hansen
 Peter Simmons as Owen Tucker
 Cristina Lawson as Karen Banning
 Kitao Sakurai as Justin Banning
 Dee Wallace as Georgia Tucker
 Michael Bailey Smith as "Tiny"
 Cole S. McKay as Bo
 Barbara Boyd as Isabel Jackson
 Justin Brentley as Luther Phelps Jr.
 Andra R. Ward as Reverend Luther Phelps Sr.
 John Robert Thompson as Mayor Wilson
 R. Lee Ermey as Preacher Brian (uncredited)
 David Rody as Arms Dealer
 Kane Hodder as Neo Nazi Gunman
 Mark Kreuzman as Random Neo Nazi
 Michele L. Bartlett (Bennett) as Girl Leaving Ice Cream Shop
 Jerra Wisecup (Thompson) as Girl In Choir
 John E. Blazier as Trucker / Neo Nazi

Reception 
Andy Webb of The Movie Scene gave it 2 stars out of 5, saying the film "feels quite corny", and that "with plenty of over the top action and cringe worthy comedy [the film] just doesn't work".

The film received a 15 certificate in the United Kingdom.

References

External links
 
 
 

1995 action films
1995 martial arts films
1995 films
1995 direct-to-video films
1990s English-language films
American action films
American adventure drama films
American direct-to-video films
American martial arts films
American sequel films
Best of the Best (film series)
Buena Vista Home Entertainment direct-to-video films
Films about Korean Americans
Taekwondo films
Hapkido films
Direct-to-video sequel films
Films about neo-Nazism
Films directed by Phillip Rhee
Films scored by Barry Goldberg
Films shot in Indiana
1990s American films